Raoul Riganti (2 February 1893 Buenos Aires  – 1 October 1970 Buenos Aires) was an Argentine racecar driver. He competed in the Indianapolis 500 three times, qualifying every year he was entered. Riganti was briefly an adviser of driver Juan Manuel Fangio.

Indy 500 results

References

1893 births
1970 deaths
Racing drivers from Buenos Aires
Argentine racing drivers
Indianapolis 500 drivers
Burials at La Chacarita Cemetery